Government Medical College, Rajouri (GMC-R) is a full-fledged tertiary referral Government Medical College in the Rajouri district of Jammu and Kashmir, India. It was established in the year 2016. The college and Hospital are approved and recognized by the National Medical Commission  erstwhile Medical Council of India since the year of inception of the college.

About college
The college imparts the degree Bachelor of Medicine and Surgery (MBBS). Nursing and para-medical courses are also offered. The college is affiliated with the University of Jammu and is recognised by the National Medical Commission erstwhile Medical Council of India. Selection to the college is done on the basis of merit through the National Eligibility cum Entrance Test. Yearly undergraduate student intake is 100 from the year 2019. The intake has been increased to 115 from the year 2020 Batch.

17 seats from the total intake have been pooled into the All India Quota, leaving behind 98 seats for the State Quota in the course of MBBS.

Courses
Government Medical College Rajouri is currently offering postgraduate and undergraduate medical programs like:

 Diplomate of National Board
 Bachelor of Medicine Bachelor of Surgery
 Bachelor of Science in Nursing 
 Allied Sciences
 Paramedical

List of principals
 Prof. (Dr) Zahid Hussain Gillani (04-07-2018 to 25-04-2019)
 Prof. (Dr) Kuldeep Singh (26-04-2019 to 30-04-2021)
 Prof. (Dr) Brij Mohan Gupta (01-05-2021 to 31-12-2021) 
 Prof. (Dr) Ghulam Ali Shah (01-01-2022 to 30-04-2022)
 Prof. (Dr) Shashi Sudhan Sharma (01-05-2022 to 22-10-2022)
 Prof. (Dr) Amarjeet Singh Bhatia (23-10-2022 to Present)

References

External links 
 
Dr. Brij Mohan Gupta appointed as new Principal GMC-R. 
GMC Rajouri's one of the associated hospitals located at Kheora area of Rajouri city gets vital medical equipment under WB-funded project.
Dr Ghulam Ali Shah appointed as Principal GMC Rajouri. 
Dr Shashi Sudhan Sharma appointed as the Principal of GMC Rajouri. 
Dr Amarjeet Singh Bhatia, HoD Biochemistry GMC Jammu, appointed as Principal GMC Rajouri. 

2017 establishments in Jammu and Kashmir
Educational institutions established in 2017
Medical colleges in Jammu and Kashmir